Tinatin Kavlashvili (born 9 February 1987) is a Georgian former professional tennis player. She had a short comeback in May 2022, at the $25k tournament in Tbilisi, Georgia.

Kavlashvili, a right-handed player, reached a career-high ranking of 479 in the world and won two singles titles and one doubles title on tournaments of the ITF Women's Circuit. She appeared in 12 Fed Cup ties for Georgia, between 2003 and 2005, with an overall win-loss record of 8–9.

ITF Circuit finals

Singles: 3 (2 titles, 1 runner-up)

Doubles: 2 (1 title, 1 runner-up)

References

External links
 
 
 

1987 births
Living people
Female tennis players from Georgia (country)